A letter of intent (LOI or LoI, or Letter of Intent) is a document outlining the understanding between two or more parties which they intend to formalize in a legally binding agreement. The concept is similar to a heads of agreement, term sheet or memorandum of understanding. Merger and acquisition agreements, joint venture agreements, real property lease agreements and several other categories of agreements often make use of a letter of intent.

The capitalized form Letter of Intent may be used in legal writing, but only when referring to a specific document under discussion.

LOIs resemble short, written contracts, often in tabular form. They are not binding on the parties in their entirety. Many LOIs, however, contain provisions that are binding, such as those governing non-disclosure, governing law, exclusivity or a covenant to negotiate in good faith. A LOI may sometimes be interpreted by a court of law as binding the parties to it if it too-closely resembles a formal contract and does not contain a clear disclaimer.

A letter of intent may be presented by one party to another party and subsequently negotiated before execution (or signature). If carefully negotiated, a LOI may serve to protect both parties to a transaction. For example, a seller of a business may incorporate what is known as a non-solicitation provision, which would restrict the buyer's ability to hire an employee of the seller's business should the two parties not be able to close the transaction. On the other hand, a LOI may protect the buyer of a business by expressly conditioning its obligation to complete the transaction if it is unable to secure financing for the transaction.

Purposes of a LOI 
Common purposes of a LOI are:
 To allow parties to sketch out fundamental terms quickly before expending substantial resources on negotiating definitive agreements, finalizing due diligence, pursuing third-party approvals and other matters
 To declare officially that the parties are currently negotiating, as in a merger or joint venture proposal
 To provide safeguards in case a deal collapses during negotiation
 To verify certain issues regarding payments made for someone else (e.g. credit card payments)

Potential downsides to using a LOI may include:
 The parties may engage in protracted negotiations on only a subset of a deal’s terms
 Management time and focus may be diverted
 Alternative opportunities may be missed and markets may move against the parties during negotiations
 Parties may reduce their lack of a workable deal framework into a LOI, with a hope of making progress later
 Public disclosure obligations may be inadvertently triggered
 The risk of leaks, exacerbated by the desire of some to tout the LOI to the world, or shop it to other parties

In the UK construction industry, it has been noted that "a significant element" within the industry appears to be "content to have their commercial and legal relationships defined on the basis of a letter of intent rather than by clear and definite contracts", as a consequence of which problems "often arise" in relation to liability.

Specific examples

In academia, a letter of intent is part of the application process, in which it is also known as a statement of purpose or application essay. In education in the United States, letters of intent are also frequently reached between high school senior athletes and colleges/universities, for the reservation of athletic scholarships for the athletes upon graduation from high school.  School administrators in secondary education often require a letter of intent before approving the formation of a student club.

In real estate, in cases where the real property in question is not listed on a multiple listing service, there may not be an easy way to notify the owner of the property and other interested parties of intent to purchase. Often it is necessary to officially begin the process of a purchase, and allow all peripheral interested parties to begin any other processes, with a letter of intent. For example, a multimillion-dollar loan for a commercial property may require a letter of intent before a financial institution will allow personnel to spend time working on said loan necessary for the completion of the sale. The same may be followed at the time of purchase by any company. A tenant and landlord may sign a letter of intent prior to signing a lease agreement to stipulate rental rates and all regulations of the future tenancy.

In the solicitation of government grants, a letter of intent is highly encouraged but it is not required or binding, and does not enter into the review of a subsequent application. The information that it contains allows agency staff to estimate the potential workload and plan the review.

See also
 Letter of comfort (contract law)

References

Legal documents
Intention
Letters (message)